Eros, Inside Eros (1986) is a bronze sculpture by Arman.

It is in the Hirshhorn Museum and Sculpture Garden.

The artist began cutting up works in 1962; the work comments on the emptiness of the god, Eros.

See also
 List of public art in Washington, D.C., Ward 2

References

External links
Eros, Inside Eros
Eros, Inside Eros

1986 sculptures
Hirshhorn Museum and Sculpture Garden
Sculptures of the Smithsonian Institution
Abstract sculptures in Washington, D.C.
Bronze sculptures in Washington, D.C.
Outdoor sculptures in Washington, D.C.
Sculptures of men in Washington, D.C.